Commitment control is a term used in the retail industry.   Retailers contract with their suppliers to supply a quantity of product in a specified time period to a specific location at an agreed price.  The quantity and value of the balance of contract represents a risk to the retailer from the point of view that the retailer will have to discount a product that experiences a slump in demand.   The setting of targets and maxima at various levels in the retailer's product hierarchies and time dimensions; and the subordination of purchasing to these limits, is known as "Commitment control".

Business terms
Retail processes and techniques